Gants Hill is a London Underground station in the largely residential Gants Hill district of Ilford in East London. It is served by the Central line and is between Redbridge and Newbury Park stations on the Hainault loop. It is in Travelcard Zone 4. It is the easternmost station to be below ground on the London Underground network and the busiest on the Hainault loop.

The station ticket hall is located beneath Gants Hill roundabout and reached via pedestrian subways. It opened on 14 December 1947 as an extension of the Central line to form the new part of the Hainault loop. The station is known for its distinctive architecture featuring barrel-vaulted halls at platform level designed by Charles Holden.

Location
The station has taken its name from the Gants Hill roundabout, where the name Gants Hill could have originated from the le Gant family who were notable as stewards. The ticket hall is directly underneath the roundabout, located in the heart of Gants Hill district. The roundabout connects to Woodford Avenue, Eastern Avenue and Cranbrook Road. The station serves a mainly residential area, and is near Valentines Park, Valentines High School, and "Faces" Nightclub.

History
As part of the 1935–40 New Works Programme, the Central line was to be extended from Liverpool Street to south of Leyton where it would connect to and take over passenger operations on the London & North Eastern Railway's (LNER's) suburban branch to Epping and Ongar in Essex. The section of the LNER's Fairlop Loop (now known as Hainault Loop) between Woodford and Newbury Park was also to be transferred, though not the section south from Newbury Park to Ilford and Seven Kings on the Great Eastern Main Line. To replace the truncated route south from Newbury Park, a new underground section between Leytonstone and Newbury Park was constructed, running mostly under Eastern Avenue. Three new stations, which include Gants Hill were built to serve the new suburbs of north Ilford and the Fairlop Loop. During planning, the names "North Ilford" and "Cranbrook" were considered for this station.

Construction began before 1937 and most of the tunnelled section was completed by 1940 but delayed due to the outbreak of the Second World War and eventually came to a halt in June 1940. During the war, the station was used as an air raid shelter and the unused tunnels between the station and Redbridge were used as a munitions factory for Plessey electronics. Construction restarted after the war ended, with the line extended to Stratford on 4 December 1946, and then to Leytonstone on 5 May 1947. Gants Hill station opened on 14 December 1947 as part of an extension to Newbury Park.

Design

The station, like the other two new stations on the branch, was designed by architect Charles Holden in the 1930s. During the 1930s the London Passenger Transport Board had provided advice on the construction of the Moscow Metro and an internal report in 1935 by the Underground's engineers on the Russian capital's system led to the decision to construct a station in London to a similar design.

The station ticket hall is located beneath the roundabout at the centre of the road junction. It is accessed via a series of pedestrian subways and has no street level buildings, although low structures on the roundabout sit above the ticket hall and provide daylight and ventilation. From the ticket hall, three escalators lead to the barrel-vaulted lower concourse between the two platforms tunnels. The station also features miniature roundels on the tiles at platform level as well as the "roundel clocks".

Gants Hill is the only Underground station with a concourse designed by Holden that has no surface buildings. Unlike Redbridge, the station is not Grade II listed although its distinctive architectural qualities have gained public support for listing the station.

Services and connections

Services
Gants Hill is served by the Central line between Redbridge and Newbury Park stations. Train frequencies vary throughout the day, but generally operate every 3–4 minutes between 05:23 and 23:57 westbound and 06:25 and 01:03 eastbound.

Trains generally run between Hainault and Ealing Broadway via Newbury Park. The typical off-peak service, in trains per hour as of 2018 is:
 9tph eastbound to Hainault via Newbury Park
 3tph eastbound to Newbury Park
 9tph westbound to Ealing Broadway
 3tph westbound to White City

The typical Night Tube service, in trains per hour as of 2018 is:
 3tph eastbound to Hainault via Newbury Park
 3tph westbound to White City

Connections
A number of London Buses routes 66, 123, 128, 150, 167, 179, 296, 396, 462 and school routes 667, 677, 679 and night routes N8 serve the station.

Notes and references

Notes

References

Books

External links

 – Entrance to station in 1953, with low roof of ticket hall visible in background

Central line (London Underground) stations
London Underground Night Tube stations
Tube stations in the London Borough of Redbridge
Railway stations in Great Britain opened in 1947
Charles Holden railway stations
Art Deco architecture in London